Chiou Jiunn-rong is a Taiwanese politician. He was the Deputy Minister of National Development Council in 2017–2018.

Education
Chiou obtained his bachelor's, master's and doctoral degree in economics from National Taiwan University in 1989, 1991 and 1995 respectively.

Education careers
At the Department of Industrial Economics of Tamkang University, Chiou was the associate professor, department chair and professor in August 1995 - July 2000, August 1998 - July 2000 and August 2000 - July 2003 respectively.

Political careers
Chiou started his political career when he joined the Taipei City Government in March 2015 as an adviser. He then subsequently became the committee member of Mainland Affairs Council in 2016.

National Development Council
Chiou was appointed as the Deputy Minister of National Development Council on 7 September 2017 by Premier-appointed William Lai and took office the day later. On 28 January 2018, Choiu was appointed as one of the ten members of New Southbound Policy task force. On 8 July 2018, Chiou tendered his resignation from the council after caught taking a photo of a woman's legs at Ximen MRT station a day earlier.

References

Living people
Ministers of National Development Council of the Republic of China
National Taiwan University alumni
Year of birth missing (living people)